The 536th Tactical Airlift Squadron is an inactive squadron of the United States Air Force.  The unit was last active at Cam Ranh Air Base Viet Nam, where it was inactivated on 15 October 1971.

The squadron was first established during World War II as the 536th Fighter Squadron.  It served as a Replacement Training Unit for Republic P-47 Thunderbolt pilots until it was disbanded in a major reorganization of the Army Air Forces in 1944 designed to streamline training organizations.

In 1952, the squadron was redesignated as the 536th Troop Carrier Squadron, and activated at Atterbury Air Force Base to replace elements of the 923d Reserve Training Wing.  The following year the squadron was inactivated and replaced at Atterbury by the 72d Troop Carrier Squadron.

The unit was activated again in Viet Nam as a C-7 Caribou squadron assigned to the 483d Tactical Airlift Wing; the squadron was awarded three Presidential Unit Citations for its actions during the Viet Nam War.

History

World War II

The squadron was first established as the 536th Fighter Squadron and was activated in November 1943 at Richmond Army Air Base, Virginia, as one of the four original squadrons of the 87th Fighter Group. The squadron began operations with Republic P-47 Thunderbolts as a Replacement Training Unit (RTU).  RTUs were oversized units which trained aircrews prior to their deployment to combat theaters and assignment to an operational group. In January 1944, the squadron and the 537th Fighter Squadron moved to Millville Army Air Field, New Jersey, and the 87th group's headquarters and other squadrons transferred to Camp Springs Army Air Field, Maryland.

However, the Army Air Forces found that standard military units, based on relatively inflexible tables of organization were proving less well adapted to the training mission.  Accordingly, a more functional system was adopted in which each base was organized into a separate numbered unit. while the groups and squadrons acting as RTUs were disbanded or inactivated. This resulted in the squadron being disbanded in the spring of 1944 and being replaced by the 135th AAF Base Unit (Fighter), which assumed its mission, personnel, and equipment.

Air Force Reserves

In 1952, the squadron was redesignated as the 536th Troop Carrier Squadron, became part of the newly constituted 87th Troop Carrier Wing under the wing base organization system, and was activated at Atterbury Air Force Base. The 87th wing replaced the 923d Reserve Training Wing at Atterbury when reserve flying operations resumed there. The squadron operated Curtiss C-46 Commandos to train reservists.  In February 1953, the 434th Troop Carrier Group was released from active duty and activated in the reserves, and its 72d Troop Carrier Squadron assumed the mission, personnel and equipment of the 537th.

Vietnam War

The squadron was activated in 1967, and took over DeHavilland Canada C-7A Caribou aircraft that were formerly operated by the 61st Aviation Company (U.S. Army) in South Vietnam, assuming their tactical airlift mission. Operating from Vung Tau Air Base, the 536th earned a Navy Presidential Unit Citation, as well as an Air Force Presidential Unit Citation for airlift support of Khe Sanh and other forward bases from January to May 1968.  It earned a second Air Force Presidential Unit Citation for action between April and June 1970 when it participated in the aerial resupply of Dak Seang Special Forces Camp, evacuation of over 2000 refugees from Cambodia, and transportation of the Presidential Southeast Asia Investigation Team to various remote locations in South Vietnam.

Lineage
 Constituted as the 536th Fighter Squadron (Single Engine) on 24 September 1943
 Activated on 1 October 1943
 Disbanded on 10 April 1944
 Reconstituted and redesignated 536th Troop Carrier Squadron, Medium on 26 May 1952
 Activated in the reserve on 15 June 1952
 Inactivated on 1 February 1953
 Redesignated 536th Troop Carrier Squadron and activated on 12 October 1966 (not organized)
 Organized on 1 January 1967
 Redesignated 536th Tactical Airlift Squadron on 1 August 1967
 Inactivated on 15 October 1971

Assignments
 87th Fighter Group: 1 October 1943 – 10 April 1944
 87th Troop Carrier Group: 15 June 1952 – 1 February 1953
 Pacific Air Forces: 12 October 1966 (not organized)
 483d Troop Carrier Wing (later 483d Tactical Airlift Wing): 1 January 1967 – 31 August 1971

Stations
 Richmond Army Air Base, Virginia, 1 October 1943
 Millville Army Air Field, New Jersey, 7 January 1944 – 10 April 1944
 Atterbury Air Force Base, Indiana, 15 June 1952 – 1 February 1953
 Vung Tau Air Field, Vietnam, 1 January 1967 – c. 1 July 1970
 Cam Ranh Air Base, Viet Nam, c. 1 July 1970 – 31 October 1971

Aircraft
 Republic P-47 Thunderbolt, 1943–1944
 Curtiss C-46 Commando, 1952–1953
 DeHavilland Canada C-7A Caribou, 1967–1971

Awards and Campaigns

References

 Notes

 Notes

Bibliography

 
 
 
 
  (from 317th Motor Vehicle Squadron)

External links
 C-7 Caribou Association – 536th Tactical Airlift Squadron Retrieved 20 December 2013
 Air War Viet Nam – Vung Tau Air Base

Airlift squadrons of the United States Air Force
Military units and formations established in 1943